"Brightest and Best" (occasionally rendered by its first line, "Brightest and Best of the Sons of the Morning") is a Christian hymn written in 1811 by the Anglican bishop Reginald Heber to be sung at the feast of Epiphany.  It appeared in Heber's widow's compilation of hymns entitled Hymns Written and Adapted to the Weekly Service of the Church Year in 1827.  It can be sung to a number of tunes, including "Liebster Immanuel" (no 41 in The English Hymnal), "Morning Star" by James P. Harding, "Epiphany" by Joseph Thrupp, and "Star in the East" by William Walker.  It appears in many hymnals across different Christian traditions.  It has been recorded by a number of artists, including Glen Campbell, Joanne Hogg and Kathy Mattea (on her album Good News). The Kentucky traditional singer Jean Ritchie often sang this and told of her childhood memory of her grandmother sitting by the fire and singing it quietly to herself on Twelfth Night; the Library of Congress collected it from her in 1951.

Lyrics

Notes

 Occasionally, "stars" is substituted for "sons"

References

External links 

Hymns by Reginald Heber
Christmas carols
Jean Ritchie songs
English Christian hymns
Epiphany music
19th-century hymns